Bernard John Noble OBE (5 February 1928 – 5 October 2004) was a teacher and university lecturer, a translator of works of philosophy and international jurisprudence, a senior ranking United Nations employee, first in Beirut, Lebanon and then in The Hague, Netherlands, and an author.

Biography 

Noble was born in Bromley, Kent to parents of modest circumstances. His father, John, worked variously as a civil servant, an unpublished novelist and as a caterer, running a café in Battersea Park.  College School]] (KCS) in Wimbledon in 1939 on a scholarship in what would now be considered an unconventional way: having "tied" in the examination with another boy, they were given the same puzzle each to complete: whoever finished it first, would win the scholarship.

Suffering from asthma, Noble was excused sport and used his time to discover model aeroplanes, literature, music and languages. Hospitalised for his asthma, he found himself sharing a ward with a young German airman; he left KCS in 1946 to read German and French at Trinity College, Oxford where he had won an open scholarship. His contribution to the war effort was working as aeroplane mechanic at RAF Desford Aerodrome in Leicestershire.

Noble was awarded a First Class Degree in French in 1949 and embarked on a thesis on Jean-Jacques Rousseau's philosophical method, first at Oxford and then as Assistant Lecturer at the University of Manchester. In 1956 he finally abandoned the project in order "to seek a post of contemporary urgency, being tired of living in the past", as he wrote to one potential employer. He taught in a school in Switzerland briefly before finding employment as a lecturer in English at the University of Baghdad. In 1959 he went to Beirut for a summer holiday where he worked on his translation of Max Scheler's On the Eternal in Man and where he met and married Amy Jalkh. He then found a position as Assistant Professor of English and Humanities at the Beirut College for Women (now the Lebanese American University and, in 1961, the year his first son, Bruno, was born, became Translator-Reviser and later Deputy Head, Press and Publications at the United Nations Relief and Works Agency for Palestine Refugees in the Near East (UNRWA) in Beirut. He found himself translating into English from French and, occasionally, German, Spanish, Italian and 

Noble developed a love of classical music, of the classical romantics and Wagner in particular, and built a large collection of LPs and CDs many of which were given to KCS who named their new music library after him. His elder son established the Bernard Noble Sculpture Foundation in commemoration of him.

Noble died on 5 October 2004 in The Hague.

Bibliography 
 2002 The Chocolate Tram, Pen Press Publishers Ltd
 2002 Young Mortality, Pen Press Publishers Ltd
 2002 Talismen, Pen Press Publishers Ltd

1928 births
2004 deaths
Alumni of Trinity College, Oxford
Academic staff of the University of Baghdad
Academic staff of Lebanese American University
Officers of the Order of the British Empire